The Hell Not Hallelujah Tour is the fourteenth concert tour by American rock band Marilyn Manson. It launched in support of their ninth studio album, The Pale Emperor, which was released on January 20, 2015, in the United States. Beginning on January 21, 2015, the tour includes eleven legs spanning North and South America, Australia, Europe and Japan with a total of 156 shows. Hell Not Hallelujah is the group's tenth tour to spread over multiple legs spanning over multiple continents. The live band for this tour includes Marilyn Manson on vocals and Twiggy on bass guitar, and featured newcomers Tyler Bates on lead guitar, Paul Wiley on rhythm guitar, Daniel Fox on percussions and keyboards and Gil Sharone on drums. Bates left the touring lineup after the April 11, 2015 show at the Minot Municipal Auditorium in North Dakota, and was replaced on lead guitar by Paul Wiley.

Development and concert synopsis 
Marilyn Manson described the central theme of the show as an evocation of two sides of the American Deep South: the Voodoo of the Louisiana swamp lands and the "Evangelical fervor of some of the region's churches". Manson began shows wearing a charcoal pea coat and a leather bustier vest, which were gradually removed as the show went on. Bobby Olivier from NJ.com complimented Manson's appearance and the aesthetic of the show, comparing it to the concept of The Pale Emperor and saying "his white makeup fades as the show goes on, as if he's slowly returning to his rarely seen, mortal form".

Compared to the band's previous tours, the show was stripped back and contained fewer theatrics. The stage set would typically be decorated to resemble a church, with two large stained glass window panels placed on either side of the stage, while numerous stage props would be emblazoned with the Cross of Lorraine. During performances of "Personal Jesus" or "Antichrist Superstar", a white pulpit would be introduced, from where Manson would burn a book of scripture. For performances of "Killing Strangers", Manson would brandish a knife-shaped microphone, which he would use to repeatedly stab a tambourine. For encores, a falling ash effect was used on stage, similar to the effect used during the Rock Is Dead Tour in 1998. Following the November 2015 terrorist attacks in Paris and the cancellation of the band's subsequent performance at Le Zénith, the stage was illuminated with the French tricolor for the remainder of the tour.

Box cutter incident
Relations between the vocalist and Bates almost deteriorated when Manson threatened the guitarist on-stage with a box-cutter knife. Bates said the incident stemmed from Manson "breaking beer bottles so he could cut himself, but the shards of glass were hitting our drummer Gil. I got really pissed and told him to stop with the fucking glass. ... so he like, kicked a [bottle] and it hit me on stage and I'd just had enough. I said, 'What the fuck?'. So instead of the bottle, he pulls out a box cutter and says 'You want me to cut you open with this box cutter, Tyler Bates?' I said, 'You fucking come near me and I'll kill you with that box cutter!'" Bates renamed his music publishing company Box Cutter Music in honor of the incident.

On April 14, Tyler Bates announced that he had amicably retired from the band's touring line-up, stating that he helped put the band together with the intention that it could function without him when "pre-existing commitments in the film and television industry would be too demanding to handle responsibly from the road". The tour's original rhythm guitarist, Paul Wiley, took over on lead guitar for the duration of the tour.

Co-headlining tours

The Hell Not Hallelujah Tour featured two co-headlining tours. The End Times Tour was a North American tour co-headlined with American rock band The Smashing Pumpkins. Beginning on July 7 in Concord, California and concluding in Cincinnati on August 8, it spanned 24 dates and visited arenas in the United States and Canada. American hip hop recording artist Cage served as the opening act for the entirety of the tour.

On February 29, 2016, the band announced details of a co-headlining tour with American heavy metal band Slipknot. The tour will see the bands performing throughout North America, and was scheduled to begin at the USANA Amphitheatre in Salt Lake City on June 9, culminating with a show at the Wells Fargo Arena in Slipknot's home town of Des Moines. However, the first twelve dates of the tour were postponed after a physical examination revealed that Slipknot frontman Corey Taylor had broken two vertebrae in his neck. The tour will now begin on June 28 in Nashville, Tennessee, with the postponed shows rescheduled for August. American metalcore band Of Mice & Men will serve as supporting act on the 39-date tour.

Critical response 
The first North American leg of the tour received positive reviews from critics, with several reviewers commending Manson's performance. Melina Robinson of The Las Vegas Sun, in a review of the band's concert at the House of Blues on Valentine's Day, said that in comparison to the band's 2012 Las Vegas show, Manson was "a revived performer who was more reminiscent of the '90's Manson. His gestures, stage theatrics and signature guttural growl brought any tenured Manson fan back to day's past". Bree Davis of Westword said that Manson's stage presence "heightened the desired sense of faux-trauma — Manson's ability to produce an effective illusion of control over both his band and his audience is what is perhaps more timeless than the music he creates", and likened Manson's on-stage qualities to that of a politician or cult leader. Nicole Malczan, reviewing for Alternative Nation, complimented Manson's vocals as "raw and still powerful" and praised the show for its stripped-down production, saying that "those who hoped for some shock value may have been disappointed. Just like with his new album, last night [Manson] stripped back several layers to reveal a performer that doesn't need flourishes to still entertain the hell out of a crowd". Other reviews lauded the live band, with Michael Rancic of NOW Toronto calling them Manson's "strongest live band in recent memory", and said that the set list was "visceral and engaging from start to finish". Similarly, Jim Louvau, writing for Phoenix New Times, said that the band has "probably never sounded better". Marc Hirsh of The Boston Globe wrote that several songs on the set list "hit with the impact of a wrecking ball", and said that "no matter how thudding and metallic the songs were, they were almost uniformly tuneful, and the hard shuffle that ran like a thread through the beat gave plenty of them a decadent swing". Allison Cohn of 303 commended Manson's vocal performance and said that she was "blown away by the quality of the music. Each song was loud, aggressive and throbbing with rage and energy".

FasterLouder listed Marilyn Manson as one of the acts who "dominated day one of the Melbourne leg of Soundwave 2015", reporting that the band drew "one of the biggest crowds of the day", and said that Manson's "God-like aura on stage cannot be denied." Martin Michea, when reviewing the band's show at the Enmore Theatre in Sydney, commended the stage show as "top drawer stuff" and compared the crowd's reaction to Manson to that received by opening acts Deathstars and Apocalyptica, saying that the audience was "a lot better during the headliner set. [Manson] really deserved that response, because he put on a great show. Especially for the front row. I don't think I have ever seen anyone else interact with the audience as much".

Mike Ross of the Edmonton Sun said that "it was clear from such a no-nonsense, dramatic and sturdy show that Manson has risen to the occasion to do more with less, to do the heavy lifting himself minus the gimmicks" and said that Manson and the band "proved themselves [to be] a real rock band. A tight one". David Rader of Midwest Music Scene commended Manson's show at the Brady Theater as "one of the best of 2015 so far for sure", saying that "you really can't ask for a better rock show than the one Marilyn Manson put on for Tulsa".

Dom Lawson of The Guardian commended the band's headline set at the Download Festival, calling Manson a "rejuvenated performer" before saying that he was "back to his malevolent, haughty best". Joseph Goggins of Manchester Evening News said that Manson sounds "all the better for abandoning the constant instinct to try to shock as much as possible; instead, he's turned to firing through an impressive back catalogue with the confidence – maybe even the arrogance – that it merits", awarding the gig four stars out of five. In his review of the band's concert at London's Hammersmith Apollo, NME's James Bentley was similarly positive, saying "while the older Manson lacks the otherworldly vigour that his younger self did, his hoarse screeches sound better than ever". Reviewing the same gig, Andrew Trendell of Gigwise lauded the band's performance, saying that Manson "still has as much impact now than ever", as well as complimenting "the sheer calibre and range of the ground he's covered [during the band's career]".

Set list 
This set list is representative of the performance on January 24, 2015. It does not represent the set list of all concerts for the duration of the tour, which typically ranged in length between 90 minutes and two and a half hours.

 "Deep Six"
 "Disposable Teens"
 "mOBSCENE"
 "No Reflection"
 "Killing Strangers"
 "Sweet Dreams (Are Made of This)"
 "Cupid Carries a Gun"
 "Rock Is Dead"
 "The Dope Show"
 "Third Day of a Seven Day Binge"
 "Personal Jesus" 
 "This Is the New Shit"
 "The Mephistopheles of Los Angeles"
 "The Beautiful People"
 "Irresponsible Hate Anthem"
 "Coma White"

Tour dates

Cancelled or rescheduled shows

Notes

Lineup 
 Marilyn Manson – vocals, guitar on "Mister Superstar", tambourine on "Killing Strangers"
 Tyler Bates (From the beginning of the tour, until April 11, 2015); Paul Wiley (From April 24, 2015 onwards) – lead guitar 
 Twiggy – bass guitar
 Paul Wiley (From the beginning of the tour, until April 11, 2015) – rhythm guitar
 Gil Sharone – drums
 Daniel Fox – percussion and keyboards (End Times tour and co-headlining tour with Of Mice and Men & Slipknot)

Sources:

Opening acts 

North America – Winter leg
 Sadist
 Unlocking the Truth
 Hide
 Deap Vally
 Die Mannequin
 OURS

North America – Spring leg
 Knee High Fox
 Deap Vally
 Die Mannequin

North America – Autumn leg
 September Mourning
 Head Wound City

Europe – Winter leg
 New Years Day (EU mainland dates)
 Krokodil (UK dates only)

References 

Marilyn Manson (band) concert tours
2015 concert tours